Rheingold or Rhinegold may refer to:

Arts 
 Das Rheingold, an 1869 opera by Richard Wagner
 Rheingold (band), a German new wave band, part of the movement Neue Deutsche Welle
 Rheingold (Grave Digger album), a 2003 heavy metal recording
 Rheingold (Klaus Schulze album), a 2008 space music recording
 Rhine Gold (album), a 2012 album by Danish chamber pop band Choir of Young Believers
 Rhinegold (1978 film), by Niklaus Schilling
 Rhinegold (2022 film), a Fatih Akin film
 Rheingold, a treasure in the Nibelungenlied mythology
 A novel by Stephan Grundy
 Rheingold Theatre, a 1953–1957 American/UK TV series hosted by Douglas Fairbanks Jr.
 "The Rheingold", the seventh episode of the sixth season of the American fantasy television series Xena: Warrior Princess
 Ms. Rheingold, a Peter, Paul and Mary song from the album Reunion

Other uses 
 Rheingold (surname), and persons with the name
 Rheingold (train), an international express train in Europe
 Rheingold (horse) (1969–1990), animal
 Rheingold Beer, a beverage
 Rheingold (typeface), a typeface designed by J. D. Trennert and Son
 Rhinegold Publishing, an independent publisher of music magazines, music yearbooks and education resources
 Rheingold, Texas, a community founded in 1859